Milt Kogan (born April 10, 1936) is an American actor. He made well over 100 guest appearances on American network television shows. He is perhaps best known for playing Desk Sergeant Kogan on six episodes of the sitcom television series Barney Miller, and for appearing in six different roles in the 1970s on Police Story.

Early life and career
Milt is an M.D. who practices board-certified Family Medicine in Los Angeles, California. He entered Cornell University with the class of 1957, but left after his junior year to earn his medical degree. He returned to Cornell to finish his B.S. in Animal Science fifty years later, graduating in 2007. As an undergraduate, he was a member of the Quill and Dagger society. He also holds an M.P.H. (Epidemiology) from University of California, Los Angeles (1974–1976). He was a Peace Corps Physician in West Africa (1969–1972), practiced with the National Health Service Corps in Harlowton, Montana (1982–1983), served with the U.S. Army in Hanau, West Germany (1984–1986) and practiced in Vermillion, South Dakota (1996–1998). He speaks English, French, German, and Spanish.

Published works include: Escape From Montana (2009), Diary of the Ouagadougou Doc (2010), and Second Act (2010).

Filmography
He made guest appearances on many television series including It Takes a Thief, Mission: Impossible, Ironside, Sanford and Son, Mannix, The Law, Cannon, Police Story, Kojak, Eight Is Enough, Chico and the Man, The Rockford Files (3 episodes), Quincy, M.E., Diff'rent Strokes, Lou Grant, Night Court, Cagney & Lacey, Columbo, Knots Landing, Quantum Leap, General Hospital, Wonder Woman, Airwolf, The A-Team, My Two Dads, and many more.

In the 1983 NBC made-for-television movie M.A.D.D.: Mothers Against Drunk Drivers, he played lead Doctor Christiansen of Cari Lightner's emergency room hospital crew that did all it could to save Lightner from a massive excessive-alcohol-fueled vehicle hit and who painfully but professionally chose to abort life-saving efforts and also painfully but professionally informed Lightner's family at the hospital of her death.

He produced two award-winning documentaries titled Different From You (2002), and Final Farewell of the Fabulous Apostles (2006).

References

External links

Different From You (2002) at Fanlight Productions

1936 births
American primary care physicians
American male television actors
Cornell Big Red men's basketball players
Living people
Peace Corps volunteers
Actors from Camden, New Jersey
Male actors from Los Angeles
UCLA School of Public Health alumni
20th-century American male actors
21st-century American male actors
Male actors from New Jersey
American men's basketball players